Peter Staub (February 22, 1827 – May 19, 1904) was a Swiss-born American businessman, politician, and diplomat.  He immigrated to the United States in 1854, and moved to Knoxville, Tennessee, in 1856, where he lived for most of the remainder of his life.  Staub served as mayor of Knoxville in the early 1870s and early 1880s, and built the city's first opera house, Staub's Theatre, in 1872.  Staub also aided Swiss immigration to the Southern Appalachian region, helping establish what is now the town of Gruetli-Laager, Tennessee, in 1869.  In 1885, President Grover Cleveland appointed Staub U.S. Consul to Switzerland.

Biography

Early life
Born in Switzerland, Staub was orphaned when he was eight years old.  At age 13, he was apprenticed to a tailor, and worked in this trade in France and Switzerland throughout the 1840s. Staub married Rosina Blum in 1847. While living in Switzerland, they had two children, both of whom died at a young age. In 1854, Staub and his wife moved to the United States, initially settling in New Jersey.

Shortly after his arrival, Staub's health began to decline. Concluding he would benefit from a more mountainous environment, Staub decided to move to East Tennessee, often advertised during this period as the "Switzerland of America." In 1856, Staub opened a tailor shop on Gay Street in Knoxville. During the Civil War, Staub's house on the periphery of Knoxville was burned by the Union Army to prevent Confederate soldiers from using it for shelter. He rebuilt it, and his tailoring business thrived in the post-war years. He reinvested his profits in real estate in the Knoxville area.

Staub's Theatre

During the years following the Civil War, Knoxville gained a reputation for cultural backwardness that many of the city's residents found embarrassing.  The Knoxville Whig and other newspapers called on the city's wealthy to fund construction of a respectable theater.  In 1871, Staub announced he was building a three-story opera house at the corner of Gay and Cumberland, across the street from the Lamar House Hotel.

The theater opened on October 2, 1872, with a dedication by former congressman Thomas A. R. Nelson and a performance of Sheridan Knowles's William Tell by the Knoxville Histrionic Society. The play, based on the Swiss folk hero, was selected in honor of Staub.

In subsequent decades, Staub's Theatre hosted performances by such diverse groups as Payson's English Opera Troupe, Boston's Mendelssohn Quintette Club, the Theodore Thomas Orchestra, and the Firmin-Jack Comedy Club, as well as lectures and readings, and minstrel shows. In the early 1900s, Staub's began to host vaudeville acts and wrestling matches, reflecting Knoxville's influx of working class migrants.

Public life

During the late 1860s, Staub began working with a group called the Tennessee Clonisation Gesellschaft, which sought to establish colonies of Swiss immigrants atop the Cumberland Plateau west of Knoxville.  Staub purchased a large tract of land along a remote section of the Plateau in Grundy County in 1869 that provided the core of the Swiss colony of Gruetli (now Gruetli-Laager).  The land proved too wooded, barren, and remote, however, and the colony failed to develop as Staub had envisioned.

Staub was first elected mayor of Knoxville in 1874.  During his first term, he expanded the city's fire department, and organized the city's public school system. Staub was elected again in 1881 and spent much of this second term helping the city develop a public waterworks.

In 1869, Staub was appointed consul for the Swiss government in Tennessee. In this capacity, he looked after Swiss interests in the state, including the Gruetli colony. President Rutherford B. Hayes appointed Staub a commissioner for the United States at the Paris Exposition of 1878. In 1885, President Cleveland appointed him United States Consul at St. Gallen, Switzerland.

Death

Staub was injured in a carriage accident on May 18, 1904, and died the following day. He is interred in a family plot, crowned by a large marble obelisk, in Old Gray Cemetery. Staub's son, Fritz, continued to operate Staub's Theatre for several years. The theater later changed its name to the Lyric Theatre and continued to host performances until 1956, when it was demolished. Knoxville's tallest building, the First Tennessee Plaza, now stands at the site.

Staub's grandson, John Fanz Staub (1892–1981), was a noted architect.  Hopecote, a house he designed in 1924, was listed on the National Register of Historic Places in 2012.  The house is located on the University of Tennessee campus.

See also
R. F. Graf
Peter Kern
James G. Sterchi

References

External links
Mayors of Knoxville

Mayors of Knoxville, Tennessee
Businesspeople from Tennessee
American consuls
Swiss emigrants to the United States
Tennessee Democrats
1827 births
1904 deaths
People from the canton of Glarus
19th-century American businesspeople